Darinka Dentcheva  (Bulgarian: Даринка Денчева) is a Bulgarian-American mathematician, noted for her contributions to convex analysis, stochastic programming, and risk-averse optimization.

Schooling and positions
Dentcheva was born in Bulgaria. 
She received her MsC and PhD degrees in mathematics from Humboldt University of Berlin (Germany) in 1981 and 1989, respectively. In 2006 she was granted  Habilitation from Humboldt University of Berlin, for a dissertation on set-valued analysis.

From 1982 to 1994 Dentcheva was with the Institute of Mathematics, Bulgarian Academy of Sciences, in Sofia (Bulgaria). In 1997–1999 she was a visitor at  the Rutgers Center for Operations Research of Rutgers University. In 1999–2000 she was a Visiting Professor at the Department of Industrial and Manufacturing Systems Engineering, Lehigh University. Since 2000 Dentcheva has been with Stevens Institute of Technology, where she holds a position of Professor at the Department of Mathematical Sciences.

Main achievements
Dentcheva developed the theory of Steiner selections of multifunctions, the theory of stochastic dominance constraints (jointly with Andrzej Ruszczyński), and contributed to the theory of unit commitment in power systems (with Werner Römisch).
She authored 2 books and more than 70 research 
papers.

Most influential publications
 
 Dentcheva, D.; and Ruszczyński, A., Optimization with stochastic dominance constraints, SIAM Journal on Optimization 14 (2003) 548–566.
 Dentcheva, D.; Prékopa, A.; Ruszczyński, A., Concavity and efficient points of discrete distributions in probabilistic programming, Mathematical Programming 89, 2000, 55–77.
 Dentcheva, D.; Römisch, W., Optimal power generation under uncertainty via stochastic programming, in: Stochastic Programming Methods and Technical Applications (K. Marti and P. Kall Eds.), Lecture Notes in Economics and Mathematical Systems, Springer Verlag, 1998.
 Dentcheva, D.;  Helbig, S., On variational principles, level sets, well-posedness, and ∈-solutions in vector optimization, Journal of Optimization Theory and Applications 89, 1996, 325–349.

References

1958 births
Living people
Bulgarian mathematicians
Bulgarian women mathematicians
20th-century American mathematicians
21st-century American mathematicians
American women mathematicians
Bulgarian emigrants to the United States
Humboldt University of Berlin alumni
Rutgers University faculty
Lehigh University faculty